Sarcochilus ceciliae, commonly known as fairy bells, is a lithophytic orchid endemic to eastern Australia. It has up to ten channelled, spotted linear leaves and up to twenty pink flowers with a hairy labellum.

Description
Sarcochilus ceciliae is a lithophytic herb that forms small clumps on rocks. The side lobes are erect and hairy and the middle lobe is short, thick and densely hairy. Flowering occurs between October and March.

Taxonomy and naming
Sarcochilus ceciliae was first formally described in 1865 by Ferdinand von Mueller and the description was published in Fragmenta phytographiae Australiae from a specimen collected near Cleveland Bay by Edward Bowman. The specific epithet (ceciliae) honours Cecilia Viennot van Maseyk.

Distribution and habitat
Fairy bells mainly grows on rocks and cliff faces in humid places. It occurs between the Atherton Tableland in Queensland and the Hastings River catchment in New South Wales.

References

Endemic orchids of Australia
Orchids of New South Wales
Orchids of Queensland
Plants described in 1865
ceciliae
Taxa named by Ferdinand von Mueller